Minye Thihathu is a Burmese royal title, and may refer to:

 Thihathu of Ava, King of Ava 1421–1425
 Mingyi Swe, Minye Thihathu, Viceroy of Toungoo 1540–1549
 Minye Thihathu II of Toungoo, Viceroy of Toungoo 1584–1597; King of Toungoo (1597–1609)

See also
Burmese royal titles

Burmese royal titles